Pamela Rabe (born Pamela June Koropatnick, 30 April 1959) is a Canadian–Australian actress and theatre director. A graduate of the Playhouse Acting School in Vancouver, Rabe is best known for her appearances in the Australian films Sirens, Cosi and Paradise Road, and for starring as Joan Ferguson in the television drama series Wentworth.

Early life
Rabe was born in Oakville, Ontario, Canada in 1959. The seventh of eight children, she graduated from the Playhouse Acting School in Vancouver. Rabe relocated to Australia in 1983 with Australian director, Roger Hodgman. They were married in 1984.

Career

Theatre

Rabe is a prolific contributor to theatrical life in her adopted country in acting and directing, across a wide range of genres - musicals, comedy and drama. With the works of Shakespeare, Molière, Chekhov, Brecht, Noël Coward, Patrick White and David Mamet forming just a part of her theatrical CV, Rabe has played leading roles on the Australian stage in some of the greatest stage plays of our time. She is a long-standing collaborator with the Sydney Theatre Company and the Melbourne Theatre Company. Rabe was once described by Melbourne theatre critic Alison Croggon as having the sort of presence that "makes shy people swallow hard and lesser mortals involuntarily bow".

Some of her other high-profile acting roles include Amanda Wingfield in Tennessee Williams's The Glass Menagerie at Belvoir, for which she won a Helpmann Award, Nora Boyle in Patrick White's The Season at Sarsaparilla, for which she won a Green Room Award for Best Actress, Richard III in the Sydney Theatre Company production of The War Of The Roses, which also starred Cate Blanchett as Richard II. and Marquise Isabelle de Merteuil in Les Liaisons Dangereuses alongside Hugo Weaving.

In 2005 she performed a challenging experimental Croatian play called Woman-Bomb. where she inhabited the body and mind of a suicide bomber.

In 2010 she starred in the Melbourne stage production of David Mamet's play Boston Marriage.

In 2012 Rabe received a Helpmann Award for Best Female Actor in a Musical for her performance in Grey Gardens for The Production Company. In July 2015 she won a second Helpmann Award, this time for Best Female Actor in a Play, for her performance in The Glass Menagerie.

In late 2017 Rabe played the roles of Helene Alving in Henrik Ibsen’s Ghosts for Sydney's Belvoir St Theatre, Mrs. Higgins in the Julie Andrews directed revival of My Fair Lady (replacing Robyn Nevin), and the role of Mary in Colm Tóibín's The Testament of Mary, at The Malthouse Theatre, Melbourne. In 2018, Rabe starred in Lucy Kirkwood's play The Children at the Melbourne Theatre Company.

Rabe turned her hand to theatre directing in 2009, and has directed several high-profile plays for Australian theatre companies, including the Australian premiere of In the Next Room (or The Vibrator Play), and Elling for the Melbourne Theatre Company. Rabe was nominated for a Green Room Award for best direction on both occasions. In 2012 Rabe was invited to be a member of the guest triumvirate who programmed the Melbourne Theatre Company season for that year.

Film

In 1989, Rabe made her film debut with a minor role in Against the Innocent. Her second role came in 1993 when she was cast in John Duigan's romantic comedy Sirens with Hugh Grant and Sam Neill. Rabe's first leading role was in the 1995 film Vacant Possession. Following this, she appeared in Così with Toni Collette, Lust and Revenge directed by Paul Cox, and Paradise Road starring Glenn Close and set during World War II. In 1997, Rabe was cast in the leading role of Hester in The Well (1997 film), an adaptation of Elizabeth Jolley's novel The Well, for which she received an Australian Film Institute Award for Best Actress. More recently, she appeared in the Jasmila Žbanić film For Those Who Can Tell No Tales and narrated the film Symphony of the Wild.

Television

Rabe's Australian television credits include an early guest role on the soap opera A Country Practice, recurring roles on the family series Ocean Girl and The Secret Life of Us, and a lead role in the short lived series Mercury.

In September 2013, it was announced that Rabe would join the cast of the Australian prison drama series Wentworth, a reimagining of the classic Network Ten soap opera Prisoner. She joined Wentworth in Season Two as sadistic prison governor Joan "The Freak" Ferguson, a role originally played by Maggie Kirkpatrick in Prisoner. Her character was initially killed off at the end of the fifth season, when she is buried alive by Will Jackson (Robbie Magasiva), and she made her then final appearances in two episodes of the sixth season as a figment of Will's imagination. The seventh season of Wentworth was intended to be the last, however, it was once again renewed and the ending of Season Seven was rewritten to include Joan, who is revealed to be alive. Rabe reprised her role for the 20-episode eighth and final season, which aired its first part in 2020, while the final part was aired in 2021. Rabe has been nominated for multiple awards for her performance, winning the 2015 AACTA Award for Best Lead Actress in a Television Drama and the 2018 Logie Award for Most Outstanding Actress.

In 2017, Rabe played the role of Maude in the 6-part TV series Fucking Adelaide, which premiered at the Adelaide Film Festival in October 2017.

In 2018 Rabe would guest appear in Wentworth in Series 6, film mini series 'The Hunting' and continue performing in theatre.

Rabe would return to theatre in 2020 for the play 'Monster' but the performances where put on hold due to COVID restrictions, it was finally announced that Monster would go ahead in 2022 but Rabe would withdraw from the play and the role went to Alison Whyte, Rabe also performed a vocal performance of Shakespeare works in 2021 with the Melbourne Symphony Orchestra.

Rabe joined the cast of Deadloch and Bay of Fires in 2022.

Other work

Rabe served on the board of the Australian Film Institute from 1999–2002 and is a former member of the Board of Directors of NIDA.

Filmography

Film

Television

Awards and nominations

References

Further reading
Pamela Rabe in Melbourne Magazine, 30 July 2010
A Woman of Substance, The Age, 23 April 1994

External links

Pamela-Rabe.com

1959 births
Living people
People from Oakville, Ontario
Actresses from Ontario
Canadian emigrants to Australia
Canadian stage actresses
Canadian film actresses
Canadian television actresses
Australian stage actresses
Australian film actresses
Australian television actresses
Australian theatre directors
Helpmann Award winners
Best Actress AACTA Award winners
20th-century Australian actresses
20th-century Canadian actresses
21st-century Australian actresses
21st-century Canadian actresses
Logie Award winners